Rebellion In Dreamland was an EP released in 1995 by the German power metal band Gamma Ray prior to the release of their album Land of the Free. This is the first release with Kai Hansen on vocals since the departure of Ralf Scheepers.

Track listing
 "Rebellion in Dreamland" – 8:43 (Hansen)
 "Land of the Free" – 4:37 (Hansen)
 "Heavy Metal Mania" (Holocaust cover) – 4:49 (Mortimer)
 "As Time Goes By" - 4:54 (Hansen/Sielck)

 "Rebellion in Dreamland" and "Land of the Free" also appear on the album Land of the Free.
 "As Time Goes By" also appears on the album Sigh No More.

Lineup
 Kai Hansen - vocals, guitar
 Dirk Schlächter - guitar
 Jan Rubach - bass
 Thomas Nack - drums

Gamma Ray (band) albums
1995 EPs
Albums produced by Kai Hansen